The 1986 Kouros 1000 km Spa was the eighth round of the 1986 World Sports-Prototype Championship.  It took place at the Circuit de Spa-Francorchamps, Belgium on September 14, 1986.

Official results
Class winners in bold.  Cars failing to complete 75% of the winner's distance marked as Not Classified (NC).

Statistics
 Pole Position - #17 Brun Motorsport - 2:06.870
 Fastest Lap - #51 Silk Cut Jaguar - 2:09.380
 Average Speed - 179.978 km/h

References

 
 

Spa
1000km
6 Hours of Spa-Francorchamps